Riverway, also referred to as "the Riverway," is a parkway in Boston, Massachusetts. The parkway is a link in the Emerald Necklace system of parks and parkways designed by Frederick Law Olmsted in the 1890s. Starting at the Landmark Center end of the Back Bay Fens, the parkway follows the path of the Muddy River south to Olmsted Park across a stone bridge over Route 9 near Brookline Village. The road and its associated park form Boston's western border with neighboring Brookline and is popular with local nearby residents in both municipalities.

Major intersections
The entire route is in Boston, Suffolk County.

Notes

External links

Frederick Law Olmsted National Historic Site
The Emerald Necklace Conservancy

Emerald Necklace
Frederick Law Olmsted works
Streets in Boston
Parkways in Massachusetts